Tuija Kinnunen (born 10 May 1965) is a Finnish former racing cyclist. She finished in second place in the Finnish National Road Race Championships in 1998.

References

External links

1965 births
Living people
Finnish female cyclists
Place of birth missing (living people)